Vaughn Fowler (born July 7, 1995) is an American professional soccer player.

Career
On July 12, 2013 it was announced that Fowler, along with Evan Fowler, were promoted to the Richmond Kickers first-team, becoming the very first Academy graduates to make it to the first-team. Fowler then made his professional debut for the Kickers in the USL Pro on August 10 against the Dayton Dutch Lions in which he came on in the 84th minute for Sascha Görres as the Kickers won the game 5–2.

Career statistics

References

External links
Kickers profile

1995 births
Living people
American soccer players
Richmond Kickers players
Association football midfielders
USL Championship players